The 1955 Le Mans disaster was a major crash that occurred on 11 June 1955 during the 24 Hours of Le Mans motor race at Circuit de la Sarthe in Le Mans, Sarthe, France. Large pieces of debris flew into the crowd, killing 83 spectators and French driver Pierre Levegh, and injuring nearly 180 more. It was the most catastrophic crash in motorsport history, and it prompted Mercedes-Benz to withdraw from motor racing until 1989.

The crash started when Jaguar driver Mike Hawthorn pulled to the right side of the track in front of Austin-Healey driver Lance Macklin and started braking for his pit stop. Macklin swerved out from behind the slowing Jaguar into the path of Levegh, who was passing on the left in his much faster Mercedes-Benz 300 SLR. Levegh rear-ended Macklin at high speed, overriding Macklin's car and launching his own car through the air. Levegh's car skipped over a protective earthen berm at 200 km/h (125 mph) and made at least two impacts within the spectator area, the last of which caused the car to disintegrate, throwing him onto the track where he was instantly killed. Large pieces of debris, including the Mercedes' engine block, radiator, front suspension, and bonnet (hood), were sent flying into the packed spectator area in front of the grandstand. The rear of Levegh's car landed on the berm and exploded into flames.

There was much debate over blame for the disaster. The official inquiry held none of the drivers specifically responsible and criticised the layout of the 30-year-old track, which had not been designed for cars as fast as those involved in the crash.

Before the crash
There was great anticipation for the 1955 24 Hours of Le Mans, as Ferrari, Jaguar, and Mercedes-Benz had all won the race previously and all three automakers had arrived with new and improved cars. The Ferraris, current champions at the time, were very fast but fragile and prone to mechanical failure. Jaguar concentrated their racing almost exclusively on Le Mans and had a very experienced driver line-up, including Formula 1 (F1) Ferrari driver Mike Hawthorn.

After conquering F1, Mercedes-Benz had debuted its new 300 SLR in that year's World Sportscar Championship, including a record-setting win at the Mille Miglia for Stirling Moss. The 300 SLR featured a body made of an ultra-lightweight magnesium alloy called Elektron. The car lacked the more effective state-of-the-art disc brakes featured on the rival Jaguar D-Type, instead incorporating inboard drum brakes and a large air brake behind the driver that could be raised to increase drag and slow the car.

Mercedes team manager Alfred Neubauer assembled a multinational team for the race: pairing his two best drivers Juan Manuel Fangio and Stirling Moss in the lead car, 1952 race-winner Karl Kling with Frenchman André Simon (both also in the current F1 team) and American John Fitch with one of the elder statesmen of French motor-racing, Pierre Levegh. It had been Levegh's unprecedented solo drive in the 1952 race that failed in the last hour, which allowed Mercedes-Benz their first Le Mans victory.

That said, the circuit had been resurfaced and widened after the Second World War. The pits and grandstands had been reconstructed, but there were no barriers between the pit lane and the racing line, and only a  earthen bank between the track and the spectators. The cars had no seat belts; the drivers reasoned that it was preferable to be thrown clear in a collision rather than be crushed or trapped in a burning car.

The 1955 race began at 4pm on Saturday, and, as predicted, the lead cars of Eugenio Castellotti (Ferrari), Hawthorn (Jaguar), and Fangio (Mercedes-Benz) were at the head of the field in the first hour. The other team cars were being kept on tighter leashes to conserve the cars, but still racing in the top ten. Going into the second hour, Castellotti started dropping back, but Hawthorn and Fangio continued the duel, swapping the lead and dropping the lap record further and further, lapping most of the field.

The accident happened at 6:26 pm, at the end of lap 35, when the first pit stops for the leading cars were starting.

Crash

Immediate cause

On lap 35, Hawthorn and Fangio were racing as hard as ever. In his biography, Hawthorn said he was "momentarily mesmerized by the legend of the Mercedes superiority... Then I came to my senses and thought ‘Damn it, why should a German car beat a British car.'" The lap before, Hawthorn's pit crew had signalled for him to come in the next lap. He had just lapped Levegh (running sixth) after Arnage (one of the corners of the race track) and was determined to keep Fangio at bay as long as possible. Coming out of the Maison Blanche portion of the course, he rapidly caught Lance Macklin in his Austin Healey 100S, who had seen him and moved over to the right to let him pass. Putting another lap on Macklin coming up to the main straight, Hawthorn then raised his hand to indicate he was pitting and pulled across to the right (from Hawthorn's testimony). What caught Macklin out though was that Hawthorn, using the Jaguar's advanced disc brakes, braked hard enough to slow his Jaguar from such a speed in time.

Collision

There were two key factors regarding the track layout at that time – first, there was no designated deceleration lane for cars coming into the pits, and second, that just before the main straight, there was a very slight right-hand kink in the road just after which Hawthorn started braking.

Macklin, who also braked hard, ran off the right-hand edge of the track, throwing up dust. Noticing that Hawthorn was slowing down, Macklin swerved left to avoid Hawthorn, whether it was an instinctive reaction, a loss of control from going onto the change of road-surface, or his car's disc brakes operating unevenly. As a result, Macklin's car veered across to the centre of the track, apparently briefly out of control. Levegh had no time to evade, and with possibly his last action, raised his hand, warning Fangio, thereby probably saving Fangio's life. With his eyes shut, Fangio — with his own quick reflexes — squeezed through the carnage and brushed Hawthorn's then-stationary Jaguar in the pits, allowing him to pass unscathed.

Levegh was thrown out of his tumbling car and hit the ground, crushing his skull upon impact and killing him instantly.

The critical kink in the road put the car on a direct trajectory toward the packed terraces and grandstand. The car landed on the earthen embankment between the spectators and the track, bounced, then slammed into a concrete stairwell structure and disintegrated. The momentum of the heaviest components of the car – the engine block, radiator, and front suspension – hurtled straight on into the crowd for almost , crushing all in their path. The bonnet lid scythed through the air, "decapitating tightly jammed spectators like a guillotine." Spectators who had climbed onto ladders and scaffolding to get a better view of the track, and those crowding to use the underpass to get to the pits, found themselves in the path of the lethal debris.

Jaguar driver Duncan Hamilton, watching from the pit wall, recalled, "The scene on the other side of the road was indescribable. The dead and dying were everywhere; the cries of pain, anguish, and despair screamed catastrophe. I stood as if in a dream, too horrified to even think."

When the rest of Levegh's car landed on the embankment, the rear-mounted fuel tank exploded. The fuel fire raised the temperature of the remaining Elektron bodywork past its ignition temperature, which was lower than that of other metal alloys due to its high magnesium content. The alloy burst into white-hot flames, showering the track and crowd with magnesium embers, made worse by rescue workers unfamiliar with magnesium fires who poured water onto the inferno, greatly intensifying the fire. As a result, the car burned for several hours.

Meanwhile, Macklin's car, heavily damaged, rammed the left-side barrier, then veered to the right of the track into the pit lane, narrowly missing Kling's Mercedes-Benz, Roberto Mieres's Maserati, and Don Beauman's Jaguar, all of which were already in the pits refuelling before the accident. Macklin's car hit the unprotected pit-wall, just short of the Cunningham and Mercedes-Benz pits where Shell and Lockheed equipment were stationed, running down a policeman, a photographer and two officials (all seriously injured), then rebounded back across the track again to end up skating down the left-side fence for a second time. Macklin survived the incident without serious injury, jumping out of the wreck and over the bank.

Aftermath

Following hours
Hawthorn had overshot his pits and stopped. Getting out, he was immediately ordered by his team to get back in and do another lap to get away from the total confusion and danger. When he pit stopped during the next lap, he staggered out of the car completely distraught, adamant that he had caused the catastrophe. Ivor Bueb and Norman Dewis, both Le Mans debutants, had to step into their respective cars for their first driver stints. Bueb in particular was very reluctant, but given Hawthorn's condition had no choice, as Dewis firmly pointed out to him.

John Fitch, Levegh's American co-driver, had suited up and was ready to take over the car at the upcoming pit stop, and was standing with Levegh's wife Denise Bouillin. They saw the whole catastrophe unfold. Levegh's lifeless body, severely burned, lay in full view on the pavement until a gendarme hauled down a banner to cover it. Levegh's wife was inconsolable and Fitch stayed with her until she could be comforted. Half an hour after the crash Fitch realised that news was probably being broadcast on the radio, and he needed to telephone his family to reassure them that he was not the driver of the crashed car. When he got to the media centre to use a telephone, he got his first inkling of the sheer enormity of the disaster, overhearing a reporter filing that 48 deaths were already confirmed. When Fitch returned to his pit, he urged the Mercedes team to withdraw from the race, as continuing to compete would be a public relations disaster for Mercedes-Benz regardless of whether they won or lost. Team manager Alfred Neubauer had already reached the same conclusion, but did not have the authority to make such a decision.

Despite expectations for the race to be red-flagged and stopped entirely, race officials, led by race director Charles Faroux, kept the race running. In the days after the disaster, several explanations were offered by Faroux for this course of action. They included:

 that if the huge crowd of spectators had tried to leave en masse, they would have choked the main roads around, severely impeding access for medical and emergency crews trying to save the injured
 that firms participating in the race could have sued the race organizers for huge sums of money
 that "the rough law of sport dictates that the race shall go on"; Faroux specifically pointing to the 1952 Farnborough Airshow crash as precedent for doing so
 that he did not, in fact, have the authority to stop the race at all, and that Prefect Pierre Trouille was the only individual empowered to do so, as France's onsite representative to the Ministry of the Interior

After an emergency meeting and vote of Mercedes-Benz company directors by telephone in Stuttgart, West Germany, Neubauer finally got the call approving his team's withdrawal just before midnight. Waiting until 1:45 am, when many spectators had left, he stepped onto the track and quietly called his cars into the pits, at the time running first and third. Their retirement was briefly announced over the public address system. The Mercedes trucks were packed up and gone by morning. Chief engineer Rudolf Uhlenhaut had gone to the Jaguar pits to ask if the Jaguar team would respond in kind, out of respect for the crash victims. Jaguar team manager "Lofty" England declined.

Conclusion of the race

Hawthorn and the Jaguar team kept racing. With the Mercedes team withdrawn and the Ferraris all out of commission, Jaguar's main competition had gone. Hawthorn and Bueb won the race by a margin of five laps from Aston Martin. The weather had closed in on Sunday morning and there was no victory celebration. However, a press photograph showed Hawthorn smiling on the podium drinking from the victor's bottle of champagne. The French magazine L'Auto-Journal published it with the sarcastic caption, "À votre santé, Monsieur Hawthorn!" (In English, "To your health ('Cheers'), Mr. Hawthorn!")

After the race
Accounts put the death toll at 80 to 84 (spectators plus Levegh), either by flying debris or from the fire, with a further 120 to 178 injured. Other observers estimated the toll to be much higher. It has remained the most catastrophic crash in motorsport history. A special Mass was held in the morning in the Le Mans Cathedral for the first funerals of the victims.

The death toll led to an immediate temporary ban on motorsports in France, Spain, Switzerland, West Germany, and other nations, until racetracks could be brought to a higher safety standard. In the United States, the American Automobile Association (AAA) dissolved their Contest Board that had been the primary sanctioning body for motorsport in the US (including the Indianapolis 500) since 1904. It decided that auto racing detracted from its primary goals, and the United States Automobile Club was formed to take over the race sanctioning and officiating.

Most countries lifted their racing bans within a year after the disaster. France in particular, as the host of Le Mans, lifted their complete ban on 14 September 1955. On that date, the Ministry of the Interior released new regulations for racing events and codified the approval process that future racing events would need to follow. In contrast, Switzerland's ban, which also extended to the running of timed motorsports such as hillclimbs, was not quickly lifted. This forced Swiss racing promoters to organize circuit events in foreign countries including France, Italy, and West Germany. In 2003, the Federal Assembly of Switzerland started a lengthy discussion about whether this ban should be lifted. The discussion focused on traffic policy and environmental questions rather than on safety. On 10 June 2009, the Ständerat (upper house of the Swiss parliament) defeated a proposal to lift the ban for the second time. In 2015, the ban was relaxed for electric vehicles only, such as cars involved in Formula E electric racing. The ban was lifted in May 2022.

The next round of the World Sportscar Championship at the Nürburgring was cancelled, as was the non-championship Carrera Panamericana. The rest of the 1955 World Sportscar Championship season was completed, with the remaining two races at the British RAC Tourist Trophy and the Italian Targa Florio, although they were not run until September and October, several months after the catastrophe. Mercedes-Benz won both of these events, and was able to secure the constructors championship for the season. Having achieved that, Mercedes withdrew from motorsport. The horror of the crash caused some drivers present, including Americans Fitch (after completing the season with Mercedes), Phil Walters (who had been offered a drive with Ferrari for the rest of the season), and Sherwood Johnston, to retire from racing. Macklin also decided to retire after being involved in another fatal crash, during the 1955 RAC Tourist Trophy race at Dundrod Circuit. Fangio never raced at Le Mans again. At the Circuit de la Sarthe, the audience stands at the pits were demolished.

Much recrimination was directed at Hawthorn, saying that he had suddenly cut in front of Macklin and slammed on the brakes near the entrance to the pits, forcing Macklin to take desperate evasive action into the path of Levegh. This became the semi-official pronouncement of the Mercedes team and Macklin's story. The Jaguar team in turn questioned the fitness and competence of Macklin and Levegh as drivers. The initial media accounts were wildly inaccurate, as shown by subsequent analysis of photographic evidence conducted by Road & Track editor (and 1955 second-place finisher) Paul Frère in 1975. Additional details emerged when the stills reviewed by Frère were converted to video form.

The media also speculated on the violent fire that engulfed the wreck, which intensified when fire marshals poured their water-based extinguishers on the flames. They suggested that Mercedes-Benz had tampered with the official fuel-supply with an explosive additive, but the intensity of the fire was due instead to the magnesium-alloy construction of the chassis. Neubauer got the French authorities to test residual fuel left in the wreck's fuel injection and the result vindicated the company.

Opinions differed widely amongst the other drivers as to who was directly to blame for the crash, and such differences remain even today. Macklin claimed that Hawthorn's move to the pits was sudden, causing an emergency that led him to swerve into Levegh's path. Years later Fitch claimed, based on his own recollection and from what he heard from others, that Hawthorn had caused it. Dewis ventured the opinions that Macklin's move around Hawthorn was careless and that Levegh was not competent to meet the demands of driving at the speeds the 300SLR was capable of.

Both Jaguar and Mercedes-Benz issued official statements, mainly in self-defence against the accusations levelled against them and their drivers. Neubauer limited himself to suggesting improvements to the pit straight and making pit-stops safer.

Macklin, on reading Hawthorn's 1958 autobiography, Challenge Me the Race, was embittered when he found that Hawthorn now disclaimed all responsibility for the crash without identifying who had caused it. With Levegh dead, Macklin presumed that Hawthorn's implication was that he (Macklin) had been responsible, and he began a libel action. The action was still unresolved when Hawthorn was killed in a non-racing crash on the Guildford bypass in 1959, coincidentally while overtaking a Mercedes-Benz in his Jaguar.

The official government inquiry into the accident called officials, drivers, and team personnel to be questioned and give evidence. The wreckage was examined and tested and, finally, returned to Mercedes-Benz nearly twelve months after the catastrophe. In the end the enquiry ruled that no specific driver was responsible for the crash, and that it was merely a terrible racing incident. The death of the spectators was blamed on inadequate safety standards for the track design. Tony Rolt and other drivers had been raising concerns about the pit straight since 1953.

Legacy
Over the next year, the Automobile Club de l'Ouest (ACO) set about making extensive track improvements and infrastructure changes at the Circuit de la Sarthe—the pit straight was redesigned and widened to remove the kink just before the start-finish line, and to give room for a deceleration lane. The pits complex was pulled down and rebuilt, giving more room to the teams, but thereby limiting spaces to only 52 starters rather than the previous 60. The grandstand was demolished and rebuilt with new spectator terraces and a wide ditch between them and the racetrack. Track safety technology and practices evolved slowly until F1 driver Jackie Stewart organized a campaign to advocate for better safety measures ten years later. Stewart's campaign gained momentum after the deaths of Lorenzo Bandini and Jim Clark.

Fitch became a major safety advocate and began active development of safer road cars and racing circuits. He invented traffic safety devices currently in use on highways, including the sand-and-air-filled Fitch barrels.

Macklin's Austin-Healey 100 was sold to several private buyers before appearing on the public auction block. In 1969, it was bought for £155. In December 2011, the car, estimated to raise £800,000 before the auction, was sold for £843,000. The car retained the original engine SPL 261-BN, but was reported to be in 'barn find' condition. It was then restored to its original condition.

See also
1961 Italian Grand Prix
Le Mans 1955 (film), CG animated short film about the disaster

References

Citations

Bibliography
 Anderson, Gary G. (2000). Austin-Healey 100, 100-6, 3000 Restoration Guide. MotorBooks International. .
 "Le Mans 1965" in Automobile Historique, no. 48, May 2005 .
 "24 heures du Mans 1973" in Automobile Historique no. 49, June/July 2005 .
 Cannell, Michael (2011). The Limit. London: Atlantic Books. .
 Clarke, R. M., ed. (1997). Le Mans "The Jaguar Years 1949–1957". Cobham, Surrey: Brooklands Books. .
 Foster, Frank (2013). F1: A History of Formula One Racing. BookCaps Study Guides. .
 Hamilton, Duncan (1964). Touch Wood. London: Motoraces Book Club. 
 Hilton, Christopher (2004). Le Mans '55: The Crash That Changed the Face of Motor Racing. Derby: Breedon. .
 Laban, Brian (2001). Le Mans 24 Hours. London: Virgin Books. .
 Nixon, Chris (1991). Mon Ami Mate. Transport Bookman Publications. .
 Spurring, Quentin (2011). Le Mans 1949–59. Sherborne, Dorset: Evro Publishing. .
 Whitaker, Sigur E. (2014). Tony Hulman: The Man Who Saved the Indianapolis Motor Speedway. McFarland. .

External links
 Le Mans 1955 from The Mike Hawthorn Tribute Site – Extensive 1955 Le Mans coverage – reports, analysis, photos/video of race & crash. Retrieved 10 December 2016
 The Deadliest Crash – George Pollen's 2009 1hr documentary analysing the race and the accident, interviewing drivers and witnesses. Retrieved 10 December 2016
 Video of accident and aftermath. Retrieved 10 December 2016
 YouTube – 'British Pathé' colour film (no sound) of the race (8mins). Retrieved 10 December 2016
 Newsreel footage of the 1955 race and crash on YouTube, from Pathé News
  (in French)
  (in German)
 Pierre Levegh at motorsportmemorial.org
 Remember Le Mans 1955 (English)
 Life Magazine report of the 1955 Le Mans Disaster
 1955 Le Mans Disaster depicted and analyzed in depth by a witness (currently available only in French) 
 BBC: On This Day: 11 June 1955

1955 disasters in France
1955 in French motorsport
Disaster 1955
Filmed deaths in motorsport
June 1955 events in Europe
June 1955 sports events in Europe
Man-made disasters in France
Sports car racing
Safety in auto racing
1955